The 2019 NRJ Music Award was the 18th edition of the NRJ Music Awards, which took place on November 9, 2019, at the Palais des Festivals, in Cannes, France. The ceremony was broadcast live on TF1 and NRJ, and hosted by Nikos Aliagas.

Performances

Winners and nominees

References

External links
NRJ Awards official website

2019 in French music
2019 music awards
21st century in Provence-Alpes-Côte d'Azur
November 2019 events in France